Northland Organic Foods Corporation (NOFC) was a global food and agricultural products company based in Saint Paul, Minnesota. Founded in 1991, Northland was in the organic foods industry, specializing in the development, production, and international distribution of certified organic and conventional non-GMO specialty food and feed-use seeds, whole soybeans, corn, wheat and other cereal grains. Northland also produces and markets identity-preserved value-added ingredients such as soy meal, grits, flours, oils, lecithins and whole soybean powder under the IP Pure label.

Northland Organic Foods is actively involved on a local, national and international level in community programs and ecological conferences whose goals are to promote organic and sustainable agriculture.  The company also sponsors a website called Seed to Plate, a non-profit informational online resource dedicated to providing a forum for the discussion of agricultural, environmental, and artistic issues with the goal toward solutions and action.

Northland Organic Foods is the sister company of Northland Seed & Grain Corporation, based in Saint Paul, Minnesota, a producer and global supplier of identity preserved, non-GMO seeds, raw materials and ingredients to the food manufacturing and feed industries. Northland Seed & Grain’s seed breeding program is centered on the development of traditionally crossbred, organic and non-GMO specialty variety seeds and grains.

The company offers a low-fat soy product.

See also
 Certified naturally grown
 Identity preserved
 Organic agriculture
 Organic food
 National Organic Program

References

External links
 Official website
IP Pure

Companies based in Minnesota
Companies based in Saint Paul, Minnesota
Agriculture companies of the United States
Food manufacturers of the United States
Organic farming organizations
Animal food manufacturers
Organic farming in the United States